Ptolemais may refer to:

People
 Ptolemais of Cyrene, a c. 3rd-century BC mathematician and musical theorist
 Ptolemais, daughter of Ptolemy I Soter and mother of Demetrius the Fair

Places

Africa
 Ptolemais, Cyrenaica, a city in modern-day Libya
 Ptolemais Euergetis, modern-day Faiyum in Egypt
 Ptolemais Hermiou or Ptolemais in the Thebaid, modern-day El Mansha in the Sohag Governorate of Egypt
 Ptolemais Theron, a city on the African coast of the Red Sea

Elsewhere
 Ptolemais (Ionia), or Lebedus, on and around the Kısık Peninsula
 Ptolemais (Macedonia), or Ptolemaida, in West Macedonia, Greece
 Ptolemais (Pamphylia), a coastal town of ancient Pamphylia or of Cilicia
 Ptolemais, a name that may have been given to Larisa (Troad), Anatolia
 Ptolemais in Phoenicia, later Acre, in modern-day Israel

See also 

 Ptolemy (disambiguation)
 Ptolemaic Kingdom
 Ptolemaiida, a taxon of extinct wolf-like mammals